Commander Wilfred St. Aubyn Malleson VC (17 September 1896 – 21 July 1975) was a British recipient of the Victoria Cross, the highest and most prestigious award for gallantry in the face of the enemy that can be awarded to British and Commonwealth forces.

Malleson was born in Kirkee, India, the son of Major-General Sir Wilfrid Malleson  and Ida Kathleen King, daughter of Frederick St Aubyn King.

Malleson was an 18-year-old Midshipman in the Royal Navy during the First World War when the following deed took place for which he was awarded the VC.

On 25 April 1915 during the landing at V Beach, Cape Helles, Gallipoli, Turkey, Midshipman Malleson and three others (William Charles Williams, George Leslie Drewry, George McKenzie Samson) of HMS River Clyde assisted the commander (Edward Unwin) of the ship at the work of securing the lighters under very heavy rifle and Maxim fire. When the other midshipman with the party had failed, through sheer exhaustion to get a line from lighter to lighter, Midshipman Malleson swam with it himself and succeeded. The line subsequently broke and he afterwards made two further unsuccessful attempts at his self-imposed task.

He later achieved the rank of commander.  He died at St Clement, Cornwall. His VC is on display at the Lord Ashcroft Gallery in the Imperial War Museum, London.

References

Monuments to Courage (David Harvey, 1999)
The Register of the Victoria Cross (This England, 1997)
Scotland's Forgotten Valour (Graham Ross, 1995)
VCs of the First World War: Gallipoli (Stephen Snelling, 1995)
VCs of the First World War: The Naval VCs (Stephen Snelling, 2002)

1896 births
1975 deaths
Royal Navy officers
British Gallipoli campaign recipients of the Victoria Cross
Royal Navy recipients of the Victoria Cross
Royal Navy officers of World War I
Royal Navy officers of World War II
Military personnel of British India
Burials in Cornwall